Hot Burritos! The Flying Burrito Brothers Anthology 1969–1972 is an album by the country rock band the Flying Burrito Brothers.  It was released in 2000.  A forty-three song compilation on two CDs, it includes all of their first three albums — The Gilded Palace of Sin (1969), Burrito Deluxe (1970), and The Flying Burrito Bros (1971) — along with eleven additional songs.

The album's bonus tracks include the non-LP single, "The Train Song".  "Ain't That a Lot of Love" and "Losing Game" were taken from the live album Last of the Red Hot Burritos (1972).

According to a note on the back cover, the entire album was "24-bit remastered from the original master tapes."

Track listing

Disc one
The Gilded Palace of Sin:
"Christine's Tune (Devil in Disguise)" (Chris Hillman, Gram Parsons) – 3:02
"Sin City" (Hillman, Parsons) – 4:09
"Do Right Woman" (Chips Moman, Dan Penn) – 3:57
"Dark End of the Street" (Moman, Penn) – 3:50
"My Uncle" (Hillman, Parsons) – 2:37
"Wheels" (Hillman, Parsons) – 3:02
"Juanita" (Hillman, Parsons) – 2:30
"Hot Burrito #1" (Chris Ethridge, Parsons) – 3:37
"Hot Burrito #2" (Ethridge, Parsons) – 3:17
"Do You Know How It Feels" (Barry Goldberg, Parsons) – 2:08
"Hippie Boy" (Hillman, Parsons) – 4:55
Bonus track:
"The Train Song" (Hillman, Parsons) – 3:04
Burrito Deluxe:
"Lazy Days" (Parsons) – 2:58
"Image of Me" (Harlan Howard) – 3:19
"High Fashion Queen" (Hillman, Parsons) – 2:07
"If You Gotta Go, Go Now" (Bob Dylan) – 1:49
"Man in the Fog" (Bernie Leadon, Parsons) – 2:31
"Farther Along" (Traditional) – 4:00
"Older Guys" (Hillman, Leadon, Parsons) – 2:29
"Cody, Cody" (Hillman, Leadon, Parsons) – 2:45
"God's Own Singer" (Leadon) – 2:05
"Down in the Churchyard" (Hillman, Parsons) – 2:20
"Wild Horses" (Mick Jagger, Keith Richards) – 6:20

Disc two
Bonus tracks:
"Six Days on the Road" (Earl Green, Carl Montgomery) – 2:56
"Close Up the Honky Tonks" (Red Simpson) – 2:38
"Break My Mind" (John D. Loudermilk) – 2:22
"Dim Lights" (Joe Maphis, Max Fidler, Rose Lee Maphis) – 2:55
"Sing Me Back Home" (Merle Haggard) – 3:50
"Tonight the Bottle Let Me Down" (Haggard) – 2:53
"To Love Somebody" (Barry Gibb, Robin Gibb) – 3:19
The Flying Burrito Brothers:  
"White Line Fever" (Haggard) – 3:16
"Colorado" (Rick Roberts) – 4:52
"Hand to Mouth" (Hillman, Roberts) – 3:44
"Tried So Hard" (Clark) – 3:08
"Just Can't Be" (Hillman, Roberts) – 4:58
"To Ramona" (Dylan) – 3:40
"Four Days of Rain" (Hillman, Roberts) – 3:39
"Can't You Hear Me Calling" (Hillman, Roberts) – 2:57
"All Alone" (Hillman, Roberts) – 2:23
"Why Are You Crying" (Roberts) – 3:33
Bonus tracks: 
"Here Tonight" (Clark) – 3:02
"Ain't That a Lot of Love" (Homer Banks, Willia Dean "Deanie" Parker) – 3:29
"Losing Game" (Carr, Weaver) – 3:20

Personnel
The Flying Burrito Brothers
Gram Parsons – guitar, piano, vocals
Chris Hillman – guitar, bass, vocals
Bernie Leadon – guitar, vocals
Rick Roberts – guitar, vocals
Kenny Wertz – guitar, banjo
"Sneaky" Pete Kleinow – pedal steel guitar
Al Perkins – pedal steel guitar
Chris Ethridge – bass
Roger Bush – bass
Michael Clarke – drums
Additional musicians
Earl Ball – piano
Mike Deasy – guitar
Bob Gibson – guitar
Jon Corneal – drums
Eddie Hoh – drums

Notes 

The Flying Burrito Brothers albums
2000 compilation albums
A&M Records compilation albums